Bangdiwala's B statistic was created by Shrikant Bangdiwala in 1985 and is a measure of inter-rater agreement. While not as commonly used as the kappa statistic the B test has been used by various workers. While it is principally used as a graphical aid to inter observer agreement, its asymptotic distribution is known.

Definition

The test is applicable to testing the agreement between two observers. It is defined to be

where  are the values on the main diagonal,
 is the th row total, and
 is the th column total of the contingency table. 
The value of B varies in value between 0 (no agreement) and +1 (perfect agreement).

In large samples B has a normal distribution whose variance has a complicated expression. For small samples a permutation test is indicated.

Guidance on its use and its extension to n x n tables have been provided by Munoz & Bangdiwala. It may be more useful than the more commonly used Cohen's kappa in some circumstances.

Tutorials and examples

Worked examples of the use of Bangdiwala's B have been published.
The statistical programming language R has a set of functions that will compute the B test, and a tutorial on the use of a test using these R functions is available.

See also
 Cohen's kappa
 Fleiss' kappa
 Scott's Pi

References

Comparison of assessments
Categorical variable interactions